The Lorenz system is a system of ordinary differential equations first studied by mathematician and meteorologist Edward Lorenz. It is notable for having chaotic solutions for certain parameter values and initial conditions. In particular, the Lorenz attractor is a set of chaotic solutions of the Lorenz system. In popular media the "butterfly effect" stems from the real-world implications of the Lorenz attractor, namely that in a chaotic physical system, in the absence of perfect knowledge of the initial conditions (even the minuscule disturbance of the air due to a butterfly flapping its wings), our ability to predict its future course will always fail. This underscores that physical systems can be completely deterministic and yet still be inherently unpredictable. The shape of the Lorenz attractor itself, when plotted in phase space, may also be seen to resemble a butterfly.

Overview
In 1963, Edward Lorenz, with the help of Ellen Fetter who was responsible for the numerical simulations and figures, and Margaret Hamilton who helped in the initial, numerical computations leading up to the findings of the Lorenz model,  developed a simplified mathematical model for atmospheric convection. The model is a system of three ordinary differential equations now known as the Lorenz equations:

 

The equations relate the properties of a two-dimensional fluid layer uniformly warmed from below and cooled from above.

The Lorenz equations can arise in simplified models for lasers, dynamos, thermosyphons, brushless DC motors, electric circuits, chemical reactions and forward osmosis.  The Lorenz equations are also the governing equations in Fourier space for the Malkus waterwheel. The Malkus waterwheel exhibits chaotic motion where instead of spinning in one direction at a constant speed, its rotation will speed up, slow down, stop, change directions, and oscillate back and forth between combinations of such behaviors in an unpredictable manner.

From a technical standpoint, the Lorenz system is nonlinear, aperiodic, three-dimensional and deterministic. The Lorenz equations have been the subject of hundreds of research articles, and at least one book-length study.

Analysis
The system exhibits chaotic behavior for these (and nearby) values.

If  then there is only one equilibrium point, which is at the origin. This point corresponds to no convection. All orbits converge to the origin, which is a global attractor, when .

 
These correspond to steady convection. This pair of equilibrium points is stable only if 

which can hold only for positive  if . At the critical value, both equilibrium points lose stability through a subcritical Hopf bifurcation.

Almost all initial points will tend to an invariant setthe Lorenz attractora strange attractor, a fractal, and a self-excited attractor with respect to all three equilibria.
The exact Lyapunov dimension formula of the global attractor can be found analytically under classical restrictions on the parameters:

The Lorenz attractor is difficult to analyze, but the action of the differential equation on the attractor is described by a fairly simple geometric model. Proving that this is indeed the case is the fourteenth problem on the list of Smale's problems. This problem was the first one to be resolved, by Warwick Tucker in 2002.

For example, with  it becomes a  torus knot.

Connection to tent map

In Figure 4 of his paper, Lorenz plotted the relative maximum value in the z direction achieved by the system against the previous relative maximum in the  direction. This procedure later became known as a Lorenz map (not to be confused with a Poincaré plot, which plots the intersections of a trajectory with a prescribed surface). The resulting plot has a shape very similar to the tent map. Lorenz also found that when the maximum  value is above a certain cut-off, the system will switch to the next lobe. Combining this with the chaos known to be exhibited by the tent map, he showed that the system switches between the two lobes chaotically.

A Generalized Lorenz System 
Over the past several years, a series of papers regarding high-dimensional Lorenz models have yielded a generalized Lorenz model, which can be simplified into the classical Lorenz model  for three state variables or the following five-dimensional Lorenz model for five state variables:

A choice of the parameter d0 = 19/3 has been applied to be consistent with the choice of the other parameters. See details in.

Simulations

def newton_raphson(f,g,e,x0,N):
   x0 = flag(x0)
   e = flag(e)
   N = int(N)
   step = 1
   flag = 1
   condition = True
   while condition:
       if g(x0) == 0.0:
           print('divide by zero')
           break
       x1 = x0 - f(x0)/g(x0)
       print('iteration %d, x1=%0.6f and f(x0)=%0.6f' % (step,x1,f(x1)))
       x0 = x1
       step += 1
       if step > N:
           flag = 0
           break
       condition = abs(f(x1)) > e
   if flag == 1:
       print('\n the required root is 0.8f' %x1)
   else:
       print('\n not convergent')

MATLAB simulation
% Solve over time interval [0,100] with initial conditions [1,1,1]
% ''f'' is set of differential equations
% ''a'' is array containing x, y, and z variables
% ''t'' is time variable

sigma = 10;
beta = 8/3;
rho = 28;
f = @(t,a) [-sigma*a(1) + sigma*a(2); rho*a(1) - a(2) - a(1)*a(3); -beta*a(3) + a(1)*a(2)];
[t,a] = ode45(f,[0 100],[1 1 1]);     % Runge-Kutta 4th/5th order ODE solver
plot3(a(:,1),a(:,2),a(:,3))

Mathematica simulation 
Standard way:

tend = 50;
eq = {x'[t] == σ (y[t] - x[t]), 
      y'[t] == x[t] (ρ - z[t]) - y[t], 
      z'[t] == x[

pars = {σ->10, ρ->28, β->8/3};
{xs, ys, zs} = 
  NDSolveValue[{eq /. pars, init}, {x, y, z}, {t, 0, tend}];
ParametricPlot3D[{xs[t], ys[t], zs[t]}, {t, 0, tend}]

Less verbose:

lorenz = NonlinearStateSpaceModel[{{σ (y - x), x (ρ - z) - y, x y - β z}, {}}, {x, y, z}, {σ, ρ, β}];
soln[t_] = StateResponse[{lorenz, {10, 10, 10}}, {10, 28, 8/3}, {t, 0, 50}];
ParametricPlot3D[soln[t], {t, 0, 50}]

Applications

Model for atmospheric convection

As shown in Lorenz's original paper, the Lorenz system is a reduced version of a larger system studied earlier by Barry Saltzman. The Lorenz equations are derived from the Oberbeck–Boussinesq approximation to the equations describing fluid circulation in a shallow layer of fluid, heated uniformly from below and cooled uniformly from above. This fluid circulation is known as Rayleigh–Bénard convection. The fluid is assumed to circulate in two dimensions (vertical and horizontal) with periodic rectangular boundary conditions.

The partial differential equations modeling the system's stream function and temperature are subjected to a spectral Galerkin approximation: the hydrodynamic fields are expanded in Fourier series, which are then severely truncated to a single term for the stream function and two terms for the temperature. This reduces the model equations to a set of three coupled, nonlinear ordinary differential equations.

Model for the nature of chaos and order in the atmosphere 
The scientific community accepts that the chaotic features found in low-dimensional Lorenz models could represent features of the Earth's atmosphere, yielding the statement of “weather is chaotic.” By comparison, based on the concept of attractor coexistence within the generalized Lorenz model and the original Lorenz model, Shen and his co-authors  proposed a revised view that “weather possesses both chaos and order with distinct predictability”. The revised view,  which is a build-up of the conventional view, is used to suggest that “the chaotic and regular features found in theoretical Lorenz models could better represent features of the Earth's atmosphere”.

Resolution of Smale's 14th problem 

Smale's 14th problem says, 'Do the properties of the Lorenz attractor exhibit that of a strange attractor?'. The problem was answered affirmatively by Warwick Tucker in 2002. To prove this result, Tucker used rigorous numerics methods like interval arithmetic and normal forms. First, Tucker defined a cross section  that is cut transversely by the flow trajectories. From this, one can define the first-return map , which assigns to each  the point  where the trajectory of  first intersects .

Then the proof is split in three main points that are proved and imply the existence of a strange attractor. The three points are:
 There exists a region  invariant under the first-return map, meaning .
 The return map admits a forward invariant cone field.
 Vectors inside this invariant cone field are uniformly expanded by the derivative  of the return map.

Tucker covers the location of these two arcs by small rectangles , the union of these rectangles gives . The problem is that our estimation may become imprecise after several iterations, thus what Tucker does is to split  into smaller rectangles  and then apply the process recursively.
Another problem is that as we are applying this algorithm, the flow becomes more 'horizontal', leading to a dramatic increase in imprecision. To prevent this, the algorithm changes the orientation of the cross sections, becoming either horizontal or vertical.

Gallery

See also 
 Eden's conjecture on the Lyapunov dimension
 Lorenz 96 model
 List of chaotic maps
 Takens' theorem

Notes

References 
 
 
 
 
 
 
 
 
 
 
 
 
 
 
 
 
 Shen, B.-W. (2015-12-21). "Nonlinear feedback in a six-dimensional Lorenz model: impact of an additional heating term". Nonlinear Processes in Geophysics. 22 (6): 749–764. doi:10.5194/npg-22-749-2015. ISSN 1607-7946.

Further reading

External links 

 
 
 Lorenz attractor by Rob Morris, Wolfram Demonstrations Project.
 Lorenz equation on planetmath.org
 Synchronized Chaos and Private Communications, with Kevin Cuomo. The implementation of Lorenz attractor in an electronic circuit.
 Lorenz attractor interactive animation (you need the Adobe Shockwave plugin)
 3D Attractors: Mac program to visualize and explore the Lorenz attractor in 3 dimensions
 Lorenz Attractor implemented in analog electronic
 Lorenz Attractor interactive animation (implemented in Ada with GTK+. Sources & executable)
 Web based Lorenz Attractor (implemented in JavaScript/HTML/CSS)
 Interactive web based Lorenz Attractor made with Iodide

Chaotic maps
Articles containing video clips
Articles with example Python (programming language) code
Articles with example MATLAB/Octave code
Articles with example Julia code
Computer-assisted proofs